Lauro Alberto Bucio Murguía (born 19 November 1993 in Uruapan, Michoacán) is a Mexican professional footballer who plays in the forward position. He is currently playing for Monarcas Morelia.

References

1993 births
Living people
Association football forwards
Coras de Nayarit F.C. footballers
Atlético Reynosa footballers
C.D. Veracruz footballers
La Piedad footballers
Ascenso MX players
Liga Premier de México players
Tercera División de México players
Footballers from Michoacán
Mexican footballers
People from Uruapan